Jésus Mederos (1890 – death unknown), nicknamed "Lico", was a Cuban pitcher in the Negro leagues and Cuban League in the 1910s.

A native of Havana, Cuba, Mederos made his Negro leagues debut in 1910 with the Cuban Stars (West). He played for the Stars and the All Cubans the following season. Mederos also spent time in the Cuban League with Almendares, Habana, and Club Fé.

References

External links
  and Seamheads

1890 births
Date of birth missing
Place of death missing
Year of death missing
All Cubans players
Almendares (baseball) players
Club Fé players
Cuban Stars (West) players
Habana players
Baseball pitchers